This is a list of fellows of the Royal Society elected in 1907.

Fellows
Frank Dawson Adams  (1859–1942)
Sir Hugh Kerr Anderson  (1865–1928)
Sir William Blaxland Benham  (1860–1950)
Sir William Henry Bragg  (1862–1942)
Archibald Campbell Campbell, 1st Baron Blythswood (1835–1908)
Frederick Daniel Chattaway  (1860–1944)
Arthur William Crossley  (1869–1927)
Arthur Robertson Cushny  (1866–1926)
William Duddell  (1872–1917)
Frederick William Gamble  (1869–1926)
Sir Joseph Ernest Petavel  (1873–1936)
Henry Cabourn Pocklington  (1870–1952)
Henry Nicholas Ridley  (1855–1956)
Sir Grafton Elliot Smith  (1871–1937)
William Henry Young  (1863–1942)

Foreign members
Ivan Petrovich Pavlov  (1849–1936)
Edward Charles Pickering  (1846–1919)
Magnus Gustaf Retzius  (1842–1919)
Augusto Righi  (1850–1920)

References

1907
1907 in the United Kingdom
1907 in science